São Francisco (Portuguese: Saint Francis) may refer to:

Places
Brazil
 Amparo de São Francisco, a municipality in Sergipe
 Barra de São Francisco, a municipality in Espírito Santo
 Belém de São Francisco, a municipality in Pernambuco
 Canindé de São Francisco, a municipality in Sergipe
 Lagoa de São Francisco, a municipality in Piauí
 Muquém de São Francisco, a municipality in Bahia
 Santana do São Francisco, a municipality in Sergipe
 São Francisco, Minas Gerais, a municipality in Minas Gerais
 São Francisco, Niterói, a neighborhood in Niterói, Rio de Janeiro
 São Francisco, Paraíba, a municipality in Paraíba
 São Francisco, Sergipe, a municipality in Sergipe
 São Francisco, São Paulo, a municipality in São Paulo
 São Francisco de Goiás, a municipality in Goiás
 São Francisco de Itabapoana, a municipality in Rio de Janeiro
 São Francisco de Sales, a municipality in Minas Gerais
 São Francisco do Brejão, a municipality in Maranhão
 São Francisco do Conde, a municipality in Bahia
 São Francisco do Glória, a municipality in Minas Gerais
 São Francisco do Guaporé, a municipality in Rondônia
 São Francisco do Iratapuru, a village in Amapá
 São Francisco do Maranhão, a municipality in Maranhão
 São Francisco do Oeste, a municipality in Rio Grande do Norte
 São Francisco do Pará, a municipality in Pará
 São Francisco do Piauí, a municipality in Piauí
 São Francisco do Sul, a municipality in Santa Catarina
 São Francisco Square, Sergipe

Rivers of Brazil
 São Francisco River
 São Francisco River (Belo River)
 São Francisco River (Paraná)
 São Francisco River (Rio de Janeiro)
 São Francisco River (Jequitinhonha River)
 São Francisco River (São Miguel River)
 São Francisco River (Jaciparaná River)
 São Francisco River (Paraíba)

Cape Verde
 São Francisco, Cape Verde, a village
 São Francisco (Tarrafal de São Nicolau), a parish

Other uses
 São Francisco Futebol Clube (PA), a football club in Santarém, Brazil
 Sao Francisco Craton, part of the Earth's crust in present-day Brazil
 St. Francis (disambiguation), several Roman Catholic saints

See also
 São Francisco de Assis (disambiguation)
 São Francisco de Paula (disambiguation)
 San Francisco (disambiguation), the Spanish language equivalent of São Francisco, several different things including the city San Francisco in California, United States
 List of places named after Saint Francis